The first season of the reality television series Black Ink Crew aired on VH1 from January 7, 2013 until March 13, 2013. It chronicles the daily operations and staff drama at Ceasars  tattoo shop in Harlem, New York.

Cast

Main
Ceaser Emanuel
Dutchess Lattimore
O'Shit Duncan
Puma Robinson
Sassy Bermudez
Alex Estevez

Recurring
Ted Ruks
Walt Miller
Quani Robinson
Kathie Arseno

Episodes

References

2013 American television seasons
Black Ink Crew